Rafat Muhammad (born 6 July 1977) is a Syrian football coach and former player who is the head coach of  club Ahed.

International career
Muhammad scored once for the Syria national team, in a friendly game against Oman on 3 December 2005.

Managerial career
On 10 January 2023, Muhammad was appointed head coach of Lebanese Premier League side Ahed mid-2022–23 season.

References

External links
 

1977 births
Living people
Syrian footballers
Syria international footballers
Association football defenders
Syrian expatriate footballers
Expatriate footballers in Jordan
Syrian expatriate sportspeople in Jordan
Al-Jaish Damascus players
Al-Wahda SC (Syria) players
Shabab Al-Ordon Club players
Syrian Premier League players
Syrian football managers
Al-Wahda SC (Syria) managers
Al-Jaish Damascus managers
Al Ahed FC managers
Syrian Premier League managers
Lebanese Premier League managers
Syrian expatriate football managers
Expatriate football managers in Lebanon
Syrian expatriate sportspeople in Lebanon